Animal faith is the study of animal behaviours that suggest proto-religious faith. Whether animals can have religious faith is dependent on a sufficiently open definition of religion. Thus, if by religion one means a "non-anthropocentric, non-anthropomorphic, non-theistic, and non-logocentric [behavioural and ritualistic] trans-species prototype definition of religion", ritual behaviour can be interpreted in the actions of chimpanzees, elephants, dolphins and other animals.
   
The study of proto-religions in modern animals is relevant to the study of the development of religion in modern humans and their recent ancestors.

Ritual behaviour in apes
Theologian and biologist Oliver Putz notes that, since chimpanzees are capable of moral agency, it is possible for Christians to understand them as having been made in the image of God.  Furthermore, Nancy R. Howell suggests that "chimpanzees and bonobos may have the precursors for culture and spirituality, such as connectedness, interdependence and sociality' and a level of 'symbolic capacity'".  Primatologist Jane Goodall goes further, noting that some chimpanzees may "dance" at the onset of heavy rain or when they come across a waterfall. She speculates that "their 'elemental' displays are precursors of religious ritual."

Ritual behaviour in elephants
Pliny the Elder reported supposed elephant reverence for the celestial bodies:

"The elephant is the largest of them all, and in intelligence approaches the nearest to man. It understands the language of its country, it obeys commands, and it remembers all the duties which it has been taught. It is sensible alike of the pleasures of love and glory, and, to a degree that is rare among men even, possesses notions of honesty, prudence, and equity; it has a religious respect also for the stars, and a veneration for the sun and the moon."

Funeral rites in animals
While grief is common to many animals, funeral rituals are not. However, they are well documented in African elephants.
  
Ronald K. Siegel writes that:
"...one cannot ignore the elaborate burying behaviour of elephants as a similar sign of ritualistic or even religious behaviour in that species. When encountering dead animals, elephants will often bury them with mud, earth and leaves. Animals known to have been buried by elephants include rhinos, buffalos, cows, calves, and even humans, in addition to elephants themselves. Elephants have [been] observed burying their dead with large quantities of food, fruit, flowers and colourful foliage."

Both wild and captive chimpanzees engage in ritualized behaviors at the death of a group member. These behaviors begin with group or individual silence, which may last for hours and followed by behaviors such as distinctive vocalizations; grooming the carcass; solemn visitation and gazing at the carcass by group members; displays; and lamentation-like whimpers or hoo-calls of distress.

Attention to the dead is not unique to elephants or chimpanzees. Dolphins have been known to stay with recently deceased members of their pod for several days, preventing divers from getting close.  However, the reasons for this remain obscure. While scientists can observe their actions, the thought processes that motivate them are beyond current study.

Tahlequah (a.k.a. J35), a female orca, carried the carcass of her new born infant for 17 days. Whether this was a "tour of grief" or merely instinct is debated.

Crows and other corvids also seem to participate in "funeral"-like ritualistic behavior, including gathering around and holding vigils over the carcass.

Relevance to the study of early modern humans
The ritual lives of animals are of interest to paleoanthropologists, as they provide a convenient insight into how religious belief systems may have developed in our ancestors. "The skeletal remains of Cro-Magnon man are found buried in the fetal position in line with the primitive myth that such a position facilitates rebirth. The study of allied behaviours in non-human animals provides an opportunity to understand their nature and function in man."  Indeed, some have seen superficial similarities between the funeral rituals of African elephants and the burial rituals of Neanderthals.
  
Evolutionary psychologist Matt Rossano has theorised that religion evolved in three stages: In the pre-Upper Palaeolithic, religion was characterised by ecstatic rituals used to facilitate social bonding. Later, shamanic healing rituals developed in the Upper Palaeolithic. Finally, religious expressions developed over time to include cave art, ritual artefacts, ancestor worship and the development of myth and moral structures.  If this is true then the behaviour of chimpanzees witnessed by Goodall may be interpreted as similar to pre-Upper Palaeolithic Human religion. However, De Waal notes that bonobos show no evidence of ritual behaviour yet are extremely peaceful and demonstrate moral agency. This casts doubt on the co-development of morality and proto-religion.

See also
Evolutionary ethics
Evolutionary origin of religions
Evolution of morality
The Origins of Virtue
Veneer theory

References

Ethology
Animal emotions